Miss Earth New Zealand is a New Zealand national beauty contest. The winner represents New Zealand in the international Miss Earth  beauty pageant. The national franchise was launched in 2001 by Miss World New Zealand Ltd, under the directorship of Ros Taylor. In 2011, the New Zealand Asia Pacific Trust acquired to the Miss Earth New Zealand franchise.

New Zealand national pageant
In 2003, Miss World New Zealand Ltd  chose to boycott the Miss World pageant due to the events surrounding Miss World 2002, held in Nigeria.
From 2003 to 2007, the winner of Miss World New Zealand competed at Miss Earth.
The New Zealand Asia Pacific Trust gained the rights to Miss World New Zealand in 2007, and gained the rights to Miss Earth New Zealand in 2011. The title was awarded to the second runner up in the Miss New Zealand Festival of Beauty in 2011 and 2012, with the winner being awarded the title of Miss World New Zealand and the first runner up receiving the title of Miss New Zealand International.
In 2013 Miss Earth New Zealand was again held as a separate pageant.

Titleholders
The winner of Miss Earth New Zealand represents her country at Miss Earth. On occasion, when the winner does not qualify (due to age) for either contest, a runner-up is sent.

References

External links
 Miss Earth New Zealand website 2011-present
 Miss Earth New Zealand website 2003-2010

New Zealand
Beauty pageants in New Zealand
New Zealand awards